Raymond Patrick Blacklock (6 April 1955 – 28 October 2020) was an Australian rugby league footballer who played in the 1970s and 1980s.

Playing career
He started his career at the Penrith Panthers, making first grade in 1976. Blacklock played four seasons at Penrith between 1976-1980 and captained the Panthers' Under-23s side that won the premiership in 1978. 

He then switched to the Newtown Jets for two seasons between 1981-1982. Blacklock played wing in the 1981 Grand Final team that were defeated by the Parramatta Eels. 

He moved to Canberra Raiders for his final two seasons (1983-1984) before retiring. Blacklock was the paternal uncle of St George-Illawarra Dragons legend, Nathan Blacklock

Blacklock died on 28 October 2020, aged 65, after a five year battle with multiple system atrophy.

References

1955 births
2020 deaths
Australian rugby league players
Rugby league players from New South Wales
Newtown Jets players
Penrith Panthers players
Canberra Raiders players
Rugby league wingers
Neurological disease deaths in New South Wales
Deaths from multiple system atrophy